Yari David Silvera (born February 20, 1976), is a former Uruguayan footballer.

He was born in Treinta y Tres, and has played for clubs of Uruguay, Chile, Argentina, South Korea, El Salvador and Guatemala.

Teams
  River Plate de Montevideo 1997-1999
  Huachipato 2000
  Bucheon SK 2000-2001
  Plaza Colonia 2001-2002
  Banfield 2002-2003
  Bucheon SK 2003
  Alianza FC 2003-2004
  Juventud Las Piedras 2005
  Heredia 2005-2006
  Cerro Largo 2006
  Rampla Juniors 2007
  Central Español 2008

External links
 
 
 Profile at Tenfield Digital 
 

1976 births
Living people
People from Treinta y Tres Department
Uruguayan footballers
Uruguayan expatriate footballers
Uruguay international footballers
1997 Copa América players
Uruguayan Primera División players
Argentine Primera División players
Club Atlético River Plate (Montevideo) players
Rampla Juniors players
Cerro Largo F.C. players
Central Español players
Club Atlético Banfield footballers
Jeju United FC players
K League 1 players
Alianza F.C. footballers
C.D. Huachipato footballers
Expatriate footballers in Chile
Expatriate footballers in Argentina
Expatriate footballers in El Salvador
Expatriate footballers in Guatemala
Expatriate footballers in South Korea
Association football midfielders